Giovanni Orfei (born 31 January 1976) is an Italian football coach and former professional footballer who played as a defender.

Club career
Orfei started his career at Lodigiani, where he made his professional debut in 1993–94 Serie C1.

Orfei and Ivano Della Morte were signed by Reggiana from Lazio in mid-1997. Goalkeeper Marco Ballotta also moved to opposite direction in the same window.

In January 2005 Orfei was signed by Salernitana on a temporary deal.

He was signed by Hellas Verona during the mid-2007 transfer market.

Coaching career
Orfei was the coach of Hellas Verona F.C.'s under-16 team, known as "Allievi B", in 2013–14 season. He also coached the same team but composed of born 1997 players in 2012–13 season.

References

External links
 
 Profile at Italian Footballers' Association, data by football.it 
 Entry in S.S. Lazio community wiki 

Italian footballers
Italian football managers
A.S. Lodigiani players
S.S. Lazio players
A.C. Reggiana 1919 players
Ascoli Calcio 1898 F.C. players
Palermo F.C. players
Catania S.S.D. players
Modena F.C. players
Venezia F.C. players
U.S. Salernitana 1919 players
Torino F.C. players
Hellas Verona F.C. players
Serie A players
Hellas Verona F.C. managers
Association football defenders
People from Tivoli, Lazio
1976 births
Living people
Footballers from Lazio
Sportspeople from the Metropolitan City of Rome Capital